Joe Cini (born 29 November 1936) is a Maltese former footballer who played at both professional and international levels as a striker.

Career
Cini played in his native Malta for Floriana and Sliema Wanderers, as well as for Queens Park Rangers in England, scoring one goals in seven appearances in The Football League during the 1959–1960 season. Cini also represented the Malta national side at international level, scoring 2 goals in 18 appearances between 1957 and 1972.

References

1936 births
Living people
Maltese footballers
Malta international footballers
Floriana F.C. players
Queens Park Rangers F.C. players
Sliema Wanderers F.C. players
English Football League players
Maltese expatriate footballers
Association football forwards